The Washington State Fair, formerly the Puyallup Fair, is the largest single attraction held annually in the U.S. state of Washington. It continually ranks in the top ten largest fairs in the United States and includes agricultural and pastoral displays and shows, amusement rides, and concert series. The Washington State Fair hosts two annual events: the 21-day Washington State Fair in September, and the four-day Washington State Spring Fair in April.

The facilities are available for rent throughout the year, making the grounds a valuable community resource. They also host various seasonal festivals such as the Victorian Country Christmas, as well as races, concerts, car shows, and sporting expositions, including the International Sportsman's Exposition. The site employs 55 year-round staff members. Over 7,500 employees are hired each September during the Fair.

History
The fair started out under the name "Puyallup Valley Fair", with the first event taking place October 4–6, 1900. In 1913, it was renamed "The Western Washington Fair", but remained primarily known as the "Puyallup Fair" until the early 1980s. In 2006, the name was changed again to "The Puyallup Fair", and the venue became known as "The Puyallup Fair and Events Center." In 2013 the fair received its current name, the "Washington State Fair"; however, the marketing tagline "Do the Puyallup" was retained and many local people continue to refer to the fair by its previous name.

During World War II, the fair did not take place. The fairgrounds closed after the 1941 fair and were occupied by the army, which set up Camp Harmony, a temporary assembly center within the system of concentration camps for Japanese Americans. A total of 7,390 Japanese Americans from the Seattle-Tacoma area and Alaska were confined in converted horse stables and barracks constructed on adjacent parking lots, the racing track and under the grandstand. In September 1942, the Japanese Americans were sent to other locations and the camp was torn down. The fairgrounds were briefly occupied by the U.S. Army 943rd Signal Service Battalion until they were transferred to Fort Lewis, then closed until 1946, when the fair set an attendance record of 100,000 people on opening day.

The cancellation of the Fair's 2020 season was announced on July 8, 2020, due to the COVID-19 pandemic. It was the first edition of the Fair to be cancelled since World War II. The fair returned in 2021 with masking requirements and limited capacity, drawing 816,000 total attendees—a 20 percent decrease.

Attendance

Attendance has grown significantly since the first fair in 1900; today the event draws more than one million people each year.

Figures
2021: 816,000
2020: 0
2012: 1,117,323
2011: 1,059,182
2010: 1,065,208
2009: 1,183,035
2008: 1,163,969
2007: 1,182,937
2006: 1,131,276
2005: 1,117,707
2004: 1,073,581
2003: About 1,160,000
2002: About 1,180,000
2000: About 1,300,000
1993: 1,420,037 (highest attendance ever)
1991: 1,414,487
1989: About 1,300,000
1980-1988: Between 1,100,000 and 1,200,000
Late 1930s: About 400,000
1922: About 130,000
1900: About 5,500 families

See also 

 Pacific National Exhibition in Vancouver, B.C., whose grounds were also a Japanese Internment Center during World War II
 Evergreen State Fair in nearby Snohomish County, which has around a third of the size and attendance of the Washington State Fair

References

External links

 

Fairs in Washington (state)
Annual fairs
Annual events in Washington (state)
Washington
Puyallup, Washington
Tourist attractions in Pierce County, Washington
Festivals established in 1900
History of Washington (state)